Spilarctia leopoldi is a moth of the family Erebidae. It was described by Tams in 1935. It is found on Sulawesi in Indonesia.

References

leopoldi
Moths described in 1935